The National Writers' Union of Ukraine (НСПУ) is a voluntary social-creative association of professional writers, poets, prose writers, playwrights, critics, and translators.

History 
The NSPU was founded in 1934 as the Ukrainian SSR Union of Writers, a part of the Union of Soviet Writers, which was established in the same year.

In post-communist time, the Writers' Union of Ukraine declared its independence from any Soviet structures (1991).

In 1997 the Union split, losing some of its members who created a new organization, the Association of Ukrainian Writers.

In 2020, the Union blacklisted publications from countries that politically opposed the "territorial integrity of Ukraine." The list included Russia, Belarus, China, and Armenia. 

After the 2022 Russian invasion of Ukraine, the NSPU called for the Mikhail Bulgakov Museum to be closed. Mikhail Bulgakov, who the museum honors, was accused of anti-Ukrainian and imperialist attitudes.

Organisation
Today the NSPU has over 1,800 members, including 84 writers living abroad. The majority of NSPU members write in the Ukrainian language, while others write in Russian, Moldavian, Yiddish, Hungarian, Greek, etc. Regional organizations of the Union are situated in every oblast centre of Ukraine and large cities.

The supreme body of the NSPU is the Congress of Ukrainian Writers, which is gathered in five years. In the between time, the Union is managed by the Council and Presidium of the NSPU. Executive functions are delegated to the Secretariat.

The NSPU has special literary awards to honour the best achievements in corresponding fields, among which are Lesia Ukrainka Prize, the Ivan Franko Prize, the Pavlo Tychyna Prize, the Maksym Rylsky Prize, "Blahovist" (Church Bells), and others.

The headquarters of the Union is located at 2 Bankova Street, the former residence of Trepov and later Liebermann.

Notable members
 Anatoly Kasheida, writer, poet, and journalist
 Pavlo Zahrebelnyi, Ukrainian novelist
 Mykola Chaban, Merited Journalist of Ukraine and Dnipropetrovsk regional studies specialist
 Larisa Matveyeva, poet, novelist, and playwright
 Ihor Pavlyuk, Ukrainian writer, translator and research worker.
 Dmytro Kremin, poet and journalist
 Larysa Khorolets, Ukrainian actress and Minister of Culture
 Svetlana Ischenko, poet, stage actress and translator
 Yuri Pokalchuk, head of the international department
 Felix Krivin, prosaist and screenwriter
 Ivan Holovchenko, militsiya general
 Ivanna Blazhkevych, children's writer, public figure and educator
 Efim Alexandrov, stand-up comedian and Yiddish folk music performer
 Mykola Bazhan, Soviet Ukrainian writer, poet, and public figure
 Oleksandr Korniychuk, playwright, literary critic, and state official
 Ivan Kulyk, poet, writer, translator, diplomat, and Communist Party activist
 Volodymyr Yavorivsky, poet, writer, journalist, and politician
 Oles Honchar, writer, public figure, and Soviet Ukrainian World War II veteran
 Maria Kapnist, film actress
 Tetiana Yakovenko, poet, literary critic, teacher
 Olena Teliha, poet, literary critic, member of The Organization of Ukrainian Nationalists

References

External links 
  (in Ukrainian)

Ukrainian literature
Cultural organizations based in Ukraine
Ukraine
Institutions with the title of National in Ukraine